D1 motorway may refer to:

 D1 motorway (Czech Republic)
 D1 motorway (Slovakia)